Edson Edmar Dias de Souza (born 21 May 1987), known as Mateus Paraná (literally Matthew of Paraná), is a Brazilian footballer.

Biography
Standing at 173 centimeters and weighing in at 73 kilograms, Mateus Paraná is a young Brazilian striker with quick acceleration and pace.

Turkey
In July 2006, he was bought by Turkish club Fenerbahçe from Iraty by Fenerbahçe Manager Zico and Uruguayan player agent Juan Figer's references. Due to foreigner restrictions in Turkey, Mateus Paraná was immediately loaned out to Bursaspor for one year. Mateus Paraná also registered as a player of Rentistas, which the club was associated with Juan Figer as a proxy.

He scored his first goal in the Süper Lig against Galatasaray on 10 December 2006 in a 3–1 loss. He also played for Fenerbahçe in pre-season in July 2007.

He was loaned to Ankaraspor until June 2008 but his contract cancelled on 20 December 2007. He did not made his debut for Ankaraspor.

Return to Brazil
In January 2008 he returned to Paraná state for Coritiba, winning the state championship. In September he left for Fortaleza.

In January 2009 he returned to Iraty and in June signed by São Caetano. In January 2010 he was signed by Fluminense. he left the club in June.

In January 2011 he returned to Paraná again, scored 8 goals in the state league. His loan was extended in June.

Career statistics

Note: State Leagues were marked as League Cup

References

External links
 Profile on TFF.org
 Profil on sambafoot.com 
 
 

Brazilian footballers
Süper Lig players
Iraty Sport Club players
Fenerbahçe S.K. footballers
Bursaspor footballers
Ankaraspor footballers
Coritiba Foot Ball Club players
Fortaleza Esporte Clube players
Associação Desportiva São Caetano players
Fluminense FC players
Operário Ferroviário Esporte Clube players
Brazilian expatriate footballers
Brazilian expatriate sportspeople in Turkey
Expatriate footballers in Turkey
Association football forwards
People from Arapongas
1987 births
Living people
Sportspeople from Paraná (state)